Happisburgh Lifeboat Station is a Royal National Lifeboat Institution (RNLI) Inshore lifeboat station close to the village of Happisburgh in the English county of Norfolk in the United Kingdom. Since 2003 the station boathouse has been re-located from the village to an area south called Cart Gap. This is because the beach below Happisburgh disappeared due to coastal erosion and the stations slipway and access was washed away. The original boathouse in the village is now used for training. 
There are currently two inshore lifeboats station at Happisburgh, an Atlantic 75-class inshore lifeboat called Friendly Forrester II (B-710) and a D-class inshore lifeboat called Spirit of Berkhamsted (D-607)

Location 
The Haisborough Sands are located parallel to the shore off the village of Happisburgh. Over the years the sands have constantly shifted and changed, and have been of great danger to coastal shipping, particularly in the age of sail. Although the spelling of the village and the sandbank are different they are pronounced the same.

History 
Due to the hazardous seas off Happisburgh, in around 1850 local fishermen formed a company to assist in salvage and rescue. Under the law of salvage, the first rescuers to arrive at a distressed vessel could claim a reward proportionate to the value of the property saved. The men also collected for salvage any goods washed ashore.

First boat 
In the 1870s, the company acquired its first lifeboat, the Friendship, at a cost of £160, paid for by subscriptions and the sale of shares. The lifeboat had a crew of 13 men. Their boathouse was located high on the cliff near the lighthouse, which made it difficult to launch the boat and return it to storage afterwards.

RNLI station 
A more formal organisation was established in Norfolk to perform rescues in 1823. The organisation was called The Norfolk Association for Saving the Lives of shipwrecked Mariners which consolidated all the lifeboat services around the Norfolk coast. It was not until 1858 that these lifeboats were taken over by the RNLI. In 1866 the RNLI established a station at Old Cart Gap Happisburgh. The RNLI lifeboat, named Huddersfield, arrived at the station in August 1866 and was a small 32 foot self-righting pulling type with ten oars, manned by the beachmen. It cost £406, paid for by the people of Huddersfield. Being on the small side, the beachmen used her for all the inshore services and carried on using Friendship for rescues at sea.

Launching from Old Cart Gap 
The launching of the lifeboat from the Old Cart Gap station was not an easy operation and needed a lot of manpower and a team of eight horses, which were supplied from the local farms. Retrieving the lifeboat and hauling it back up through the gap to the boathouse was even more arduous and required ten horses. In 1887 the station was given a replacement lifeboat. The lifeboat was built by T Woolfe and Son at Shadwell on the River Thames, and was also paid for by the people of Huddersfield. The lifeboat was called Huddersfield II (ON-140). This Lifeboat remained on the station until 1907 when she was replaced with one called Jacob and Rachel Vallentine (ON-580). This lifeboat remained in operation at the station until the RNLI closed it in 1926.

Re-opening as an inshore service 
By the mid-1960s this area of the Norfolk coast had seen an increase of pleasure craft and beach leisure activities. The RNLI saw a change in the pattern of casualties with an increasing number of services required to rescue bathers washed out to sea, people on lilos, dinghies, and various small water craft. It was realised locally that a faster first response was needed to attend such situations and to relieve the bigger neighbouring stations of Cromer, Sheringham, Caister and Great Yarmouth and Gorleston.
In 1965 the Happisburgh Inshore Lifeboat Station was opened. It operated from a small house at the top of the cliff above the gap close to the original boathouse which had been demolished. In 1987 a new inshore lifeboat house was built on the same site. These facilities included a boat hall, crew room, instruction room, drying room, toilets and washing room. In 1998 the facilities were improved and a souvenir shop was added.

Coastal erosion problems 
The ongoing problems of coastal erosion along this part of the Norfolk coastline affected the lifeboat station in 2003. Damage to the cliffs below the station and the washing away of the slipway down to the beach caused the station facilities to be closed at the village location. The operations were moved half a mile south to Cart Gap, where temporary accommodation was set up. It was clear that this move would need to be made permanent. In 2010 a new boat hall and facilities were constructed at Cart Gap, and the old station was used as training room and storage. A further landslide caused more severe damage to the cliffs close to the old station, and what was left of these facilities were demolished in 2012. 
In the storm surge in December 2013, the former site of this station collapsed into the sea.

Fleet

All Weather Boats

Inshore Lifeboats

D-class Lifeboats

B-class Lifeboats

Notable rescues and awards

The Minerva 
On 25 December 1870 the brig Minerva of Seaham was on a voyage bound for Rochester with a hold of coal. She ran aground off Ostend near Happisburgh. Most of the beachmen were at church, but four men rowed out to the vessel in a crab boat and discovered that she was fast filling with water. The lifeboat Huddersfield was hauled by road on her carriage to Ostend where she was launched from the beach. The crew of the brig by now had taken to their own lifeboat but were soon taken aboard the Huddersfield. By this time the wind had increased considerable and with the tide against them the lifeboat landed the men down the coast at Sea Palling. There, with the weather still bad, the lifeboat had to be hauled back to its station by carriage.

Coxswain John Cannon 
In 1886, coxswain John Cannon of the Happisburgh lifeboat Friendship retired from the service and as an acknowledgement of his long and valuable service in saving life from many shipwrecks, was awarded an RNLI silver medal. The citation of services included the schooner Atalanta (1868), the brigs Launceston and Arctic Hero (1871), the sloop Richard and Elizabeth (1875), the ketch Rival (1880) and the collier Ludworth (1881).

Gallery

See also
List of RNLI stations

References 

Lifeboat stations in Norfolk